The Tanzania national football team represents Tanzania in men's international football and is controlled by the Tanzania Football Federation, the governing body for football in Tanzania, Tanzania's home ground is Benjamin Mkapa National Stadium in Dar-es-Salaam and their head coach is Adel Amrouche from Algeria. They are colloquially known as the Taifa Stars. Tanzania has never qualified for the FIFA World Cup. Before uniting with Zanzibar, the team played as the Tanganyika national football team, The team represents both FIFA and Confederation of African Football (CAF). Tanzania has qualified for 4 World cups

The island of Zanzibar, part of Tanzania (and once an independent nation), is also an associate member of CAF and has played matches with other nations, but is not eligible to enter the World Cup or Africa Cup of Nations. See Zanzibar national football team.

History
Since qualifying for the 1980 Africa Cup of Nations, Tanzania endured nearly 40 years without major success, struggling in both African and World Cup qualifiers. Their best effort was in 2008 Africa Cup of Nations qualification, where the Taifa Stars defeated Burkina Faso twice and only finished three points behind group winners Senegal. In 2010 Tanzania won the CECAFA Cup for the third time.

A recent achievement was a 1–0 win against South Africa in the 2017 COSAFA Cup Quarter-finals. But afterwards, Tanzania lost the Semi-finals 2–4 to Zambia. Then, in the Third-place playoff, Tanzania managed to win the match against Lesotho 4–2 in a penalty shootout after the extra time ended in a goalless draw. This Third place was considered Tanzania's biggest football achievement in many years.

On 24 March 2019, Tanzania beat East African rivals Uganda 3–0 to reach the finals of the Africa Cup of Nations for the first time in 39 years. At the Finals the Taifa Stars, being the weakest team in the group, lost all three Group C matches, as predicted. A few months later, Tanzania qualified for the African Nations Championship for only the second time, as well as defeating Burundi in the 2022 World Cup qualifiers.

Recent results and fixtures

The following is a list of match results in the last 12 months, as well as any future matches that have been scheduled.

2022

2023

Coaches
Caretaker managers are listed in italics.

 Bert Trautmann (1975)
 Geoff Hudson (1977–1979)
 Slawomir Wolk (1979–1980)
 Mahammed Msomali (1980–1981)
 Rudi Gutendorf (1981)
 Joseph Bendera (1981-1985)
  Paul West (1985-1989)
 Charles Boniface Mkwasa (1989-1992)
Kayuni Dunday (1993-1995)
 Clóvis de Oliveira (1995–1996)
 Badru Hafidh (1996-1998)
 Sylersaid Mziray (1998-1999)
 Mansour Magram (1999-00)
 Burkhard Pape (2000–01)
 Mshindo Msolla (2001-02)
 James Siang'a (2002)
 Mshindo Msolla (2002–03)
 Badru Hafidh (2003–06)
 Júlio César Leal (2006)
 Márcio Máximo (2006–10)
 Jan Poulsen (2010–12)
 Kim Poulsen (2012–14)
 Salum Madadi (2014)
 Mart Nooij (2014–2015)
 Charles Boniface Mkwasa (2015–2017)
 Salum Mayanga (2017–2018)
 Emmanuel Amunike (2018–2019)
 Etienne Ndayiragije (2019–2021)
 Kim Poulsen (2021–2022)
 Honour Janza (2022)
 Dean Alty (2022)
 Kim Poulsen (2022-2023)
 Adel Amrouche (2023-)

Players

Current squad
The following players were called up for the 2023 AFCON qualification matches against Uganda on 24 and 28 March 2023.

Caps and goals correct as of 27 September 2022, after the match against Libya.

Recent call-ups
The following players have been called up for Tanzania in the last 12 months.

DEC Player refused to join the team after the call-up.
INJ Player withdrew from the squad due to an injury.
PRE Preliminary squad.
RET Player has retired from international football.
SUS Suspended from the national team.

Player records

Players in bold are still active with Tanzania.

Most appearances

Top goalscorers

Competitive record

World Cup record

Africa Cup of Nations record

African Nations Championship record

African Games

Gossage Cup / CECAFA Cup

Head-to-head record

Honours
CECAFA Cup :
3 Times Champion  (1974, 1994, 2010)
5 Times Runners-up  (1973, 1980, 1981, 1992, 2002)

References

External links

Tanzania at FIFA.com

 
African national association football teams